The Limits of the Five Patriarchates is a Greek text describing the five patriarchates of Christianity in the Middle Ages. It is found appended to some manuscripts of the New Testament. The text's sequence and validity of patriarchates is different from the traditional Pentarchy established by ecumenical councils, with Jerusalem moved to first. The order of the other four is unchanged: Rome, Constantinople, Alexandria, and Antioch.

The document probably was written in Calabria, in the 9th or 10th century. It is found in some manuscripts of the New Testament: 69, 211, and 543 (in 543 one page of it is lost). In minuscule 543 this document is titled "Γνωσις και επιγνωσις των πατριαρχων θρονων" (Knowledge and Cognition of the Patriarchate Sees).

Translation 

 The first See and the first patriarchate is of Jerusalem, James, the brother of God and apostle and eyewitness, and minister of the word and secrets of secrets and hidden mysteries, contains the whole Palestine a country until Arabia.

 The second See is of the Apostle Peter from Rome to the limits of mountains and French, Spain and France, and Illyricum, until Gadiron and the Pillars of Hercules and Ocean at the west end of the sun as are dead waters and properties as wooded the island as the edge of oceans populated areas. Christians ever crowd until Ravenna, Lombardy, and Thessalonika, Slavic, and Scythians, and Avars until Danube river, the ecclesiastical border, and Sardinia, Megara, Carthage, and part of Balearic Islands, and part of Sicily and Calabria, where the winds blow nasty, from the north, from the south, from the west-south, and from the east-south.

 The third See is of Constantinople, founded by Andreas and the John Theologos and Evangelist, containing almost certainly the power of the Roman kingdom, Europe and up the West Asian and Cycladic islands until Pontus, Cherson, and Abbasid Chaldea, and Khazars, Cappadocia, Armenia, and until to the endless north areas.

 The fourth See of Alexandria, of Mark apostle and evangelist, son of Peter the apostle, who took control over Ethiopia until  Africa and Tripoli and over all country of Egypt the limits of Palestine, the south container.

 The fifth See of Antioch of Peter, containing the area until to the East, the way of seven months, until to the Georgia and Armenia and Azerbaijan, and until to the internal desert of Persians, Medes, Chaldeans, until the Arab leadership, and Parthia and Mesopotamia Elamiton, and from the wind of sun rising, where the sun rises.

See also 

 Pentarchy
 Ecclesiology
 Primacy of Peter

References

Further reading

External links 

 Wikisource (Greek): Γνώσις και επίγνωσις των πατριαρχών θρόνων

9th-century Christian texts
10th-century Christian texts
Greek New Testament manuscripts
Pentarchy